Zykina is a Russian female surname, male is Zykin. Notable people with the surname include:

Lyudmila Zykina (1929–2009), Russian folk singer
Olesya Zykina (born 1980), Russian athlete

See also
 Zygina

Russian-language surnames